King Lear is a tragedy by William Shakespeare.

King Lear may also refer to:
 King Lear (baseball) or  Charles Bernard Lear (1891–1976), baseball player
 King Lear (1910 film), an Italian silent film
 King Lear (1916 film), an American silent film
 King Lear (1953 film), a film starring Orson Welles
 King Lear (1971 USSR film), a film by Grigori Kozintsev
 King Lear (1971 British film), a film starring Paul Scofield
 King Lear, a 1982 production of BBC Television Shakespeare
 King Lear (1983 film), a UK television drama starring Laurence Olivier
 King Lear (1987 film), a film by Jean-Luc Godard
 King Lear (1997 film), a Swedish television film starring Anders Andersson
 King Lear (1998 film), a 1998 British television film starring Ian Holm
 King Lear (1999 film), a film starring Brian Blessed
 King Lear (2008 film), a British film starring Ian McKellen
 King Lear (2018 film), a British film starring Anthony Hopkins
 The Tragedy of King Lear (screenplay), an unpublished screenplay by Harold Pinter

See also
 The History of King Lear, a 1681 rewritten version of King Lear by Nahum Tate
 Kuningas Lear, an opera by Aulis Sallinen
 Lear (opera), an opera by Aribert Reimann
 Leir of Britain, the pseudohistorical king of Britannia for whom the Shakespeare character is named
 Le roi Lear, a concert overture by Hector Berlioz
 The Yiddish King Lear, an 1892 adaption by Jacob Gordin, set in the mid-19th century